In mathematics, the Fatou–Lebesgue theorem establishes a chain of inequalities relating the integrals (in the sense of Lebesgue) of the limit inferior and the limit superior of a sequence of functions to the limit inferior and the limit superior of integrals of these functions.  The theorem is named after Pierre Fatou and Henri Léon Lebesgue.

If the sequence of functions converges pointwise, the inequalities turn into equalities and the theorem reduces to Lebesgue's dominated convergence theorem.

Statement of the theorem
Let f1, f2, ... denote a sequence of real-valued measurable functions defined on a measure space (S,Σ,μ). If there exists a Lebesgue-integrable function g on S which dominates the sequence in absolute value, meaning that |fn| ≤ g for all natural numbers n, then all fn as well as the limit inferior and the limit superior of the fn are integrable and

Here the limit inferior and the limit superior of the fn are taken pointwise. The integral of the absolute value of these limiting functions is bounded above by the integral of g.

Since the middle inequality (for sequences of real numbers) is always true, the directions of the other inequalities are easy to remember.

Proof
All fn as well as the limit inferior and the limit superior of the fn are measurable and dominated in absolute value by g, hence integrable.

The first inequality follows by applying Fatou's lemma to the non-negative functions fn + g and using the linearity of the Lebesgue integral. The last inequality is the reverse Fatou lemma.

Since g also dominates the limit superior of the |fn|,

by the monotonicity of the Lebesgue integral. The same estimates hold for the limit superior of the fn.

References 

Topics in Real and Functional Analysis by Gerald Teschl, University of Vienna.

External links

Theorems in real analysis
Theorems in measure theory
Articles containing proofs